Cardiapoda richardi is a species of sea gastropod, a holoplanktonic marine gastropod mollusk in the family Carinariidae.

Description

Distribution

References

Carinariidae
Gastropods described in 1903